is a Japanese historic romantic drama film released on December 23, 2006, by Fuji Television. The film revolves around the Ejima-Ikushima affair of 1714. Director Tōru Hayashi and screenplay writer Taeko Asano also directed and wrote the 2003~2005 television series of the same name on the Fuji Television.
The theme song, Unmei, was written and sang by Kumi Koda

Cast 
Yukie Nakama as Ejima 
Hidetoshi Nishijima as Ikushima Shingorō 
Haruka Igawa as Gekkō-in
Mitsuhiro Oikawa as Manabe Akifusa
Kaoru Sugita as Miyaji
Shinobu Nakayama as Fujikawa
Tae Kimura as Hōshin-in
Yumi Asō as Kohagi
Kaori Yamaguchi as Yoshino
Hirotarō Honda as Arai Hakuseki
Shōhei Hino as Doctor Okuyama
Yuki Matsushita as Renjō-in
Yūko Asano as Takigawa
Reiko Takashima as Ten'ei-in

References

External links

Official site
 
English Subtitled Trailer

2006 films
2000s Japanese-language films
2000s Japanese films